Tribe (known as Going Tribal in the United States) is a British documentary television series co-produced by the BBC and the Discovery Channel, and hosted by former British Royal Marine Bruce Parry.

In each series, Parry visits a number of remote tribes in such locales as the Himalayas, Ethiopia, West Papua, Gabon, and Mongolia, spending a month living and interacting with each society. While there, Parry adopts the methods and practices of his hosts, participating in their rituals and exploring their cultural norms. This often enables him to form personal bonds with the members of each tribe.

Parry tries to learn the basics of the tribe's language but is also accompanied by a translator.

The series is co-produced by BBC Wales and the Discovery Channel. A second series aired in July 2006 and the third began on 21 August 2007 on BBC Two, and ended on 25 September 2007. No further series have been made, though Parry's 2008 series, Amazon has a similar synopsis.

Parry was awarded the BAFTA Cymru "Best On-Screen Presenter" award in 2008 for his work on the 'Penan' Episode. A BAFTA Cymru "Best Camera: Not Drama" award was also awarded for Gavin Searle's work in the same episode.

The show has also received criticism from scholars for not using scientific, anthropologic practices, and for appealing to stereotypes of exoticism for entertainment purposes.

Episodes

Series 1 (2005)

Series 2 (2006)
All three episodes were in Ethiopia within the Southern Nations, Nationalities, and Peoples' Region

Series 3 (2007)

Songs for Survival (2008)

Alongside the Tribe (and Parry's next Amazon) series a 2-CD album, Songs for Survival, has been released by Kensaltown Records which features a variety of artists such as Mike Oldfield, Johnny Borrell, Hot Chip, The Go! Team, Mystery Jets and Yusuf Islam.  Every track on the album is exclusive, and has been written especially for the project.

See also

 Mark & Olly: Living with the Tribes (2007)
 Serious (TV series) (2002)

References

External links
 
 
 Going Tribal at Discovery.com 
 

2005 British television series debuts
2007 British television series endings
BBC television documentaries
Discovery Channel original programming
British travel television series